The term seed bug can refer to several different Hemiptera (true bugs) in the infraorder Pentatomomorpha.

In the superfamily Lygaeoidea:
Several species of the family Lygaeidae
Several species of the family Rhyparochromidae
In the superfamily Coreoidea:
 Leptoglossus of the family Coreidae (e.g. western conifer seed bug, L. occidentalis)

Animal common name disambiguation pages